This is a list of members of the 32nd Legislative Assembly of Queensland from 1950 to 1953, as elected at the 1950 state election held on 29 April 1950.

The election followed a redistribution which created 15 new seats in the Assembly.

  On 4 October 1950, the Labor member for Fortitude Valley and Speaker of the Legislative Assembly, Samuel Brassington, died. Labor candidate Mick Brosnan won the resulting by-election on 18 November 1950.
  On 4 November 1950, the Labor member for Warrego, Harry O'Shea, died. Labor candidate John Dufficy won the resulting by-election on 3 March 1951.
  On 6 January 1951, the Liberal member for Kedron, Bruce Pie, resigned. Labor candidate Eric Lloyd won the resulting by-election on 14 April 1951.
 At the 1950 state election, Labor candidate Bob Gardner won the seat of Bulimba by 42 votes against his Liberal opponent, J. E. Hamilton. A petition was lodged on 24 July 1950 against Gardner's return, and the election was declared void on the basis of errors in counting by the returning officer on 18 January 1951. Gardner won the resulting by-election on 14 April 1951.
  On 15 January 1952, the Labor member for Ithaca and Premier of Queensland, Ned Hanlon, died. At the resulting by-election on 5 April 1952, Labor candidate Leonard Eastment was elected.
  On 24 July 1952, the Labor member for Keppel, Walter Ingram, died. Labor candidate Viv Cooper won the resulting by-election on 25 October 1952.

See also
1950 Queensland state election
Hanlon Ministry (Labor) (1946–1952)
Gair Ministry (Labor) (1952–1957)

References

 Waterson, D.B. Biographical register of the Queensland Parliament, 1930-1980 Canberra: ANU Press (1982)
 
 

Members of Queensland parliaments by term
20th-century Australian politicians